Jean Blancou (August 28, 1936 (Bangui, Central African Republic - November 10, 2010) was a French veterinarian, microbiologist and author of several well known book chapters on the subject of rabies and vaccinations.

1936 births
2010 deaths
Chevaliers of the Légion d'honneur
Knights of the Ordre national du Mérite
French veterinarians
People from Bangui